Schoeblia is a genus of crustaceans belonging to the monotypic family Schoebliidae.

Species:

Schoeblia circularis 
Schoeblia fulleri

References

Isopoda